The Ohio Central Railroad System is a network of ten short line railroads operating in Ohio and western Pennsylvania. It is owned by Genesee & Wyoming

Headquartered in Coshocton, Ohio, the system operates  of track divided among 10 subsidiary railroads. Most of the system's routes were divested from Class I railroads and connect industries to the Class I railroads.

The Ohio Central operates on track owned by other entities, including a line from Newark, Ohio to Mount Vernon, Ohio owned by CSX and the old Panhandle Route, owned by the State of Ohio.

Railroads in the system 
Ohio Central's rail system comprises

 Ohio Central Railroad
 Ohio Southern Railroad
 Columbus and Ohio River Rail Road, the former Pennsylvania Railroad Panhandle Route
 Mahoning Valley Railway
 Ohio & Pennsylvania Railroad
 Ohi-Rail Corporation 
 Warren & Trumbull Railroad
 Youngstown & Austintown Railroad
 Youngstown Belt Railroad
 Pittsburgh & Ohio Central Railroad
 Aliquippa & Ohio River Railroad

Steam operations
As well as being a regular revenue railroad, the Ohio Central had its own steam department that operated steam locomotives for tourist trains, excursions, and special events. When owner Jerry Joe Jacobson sold OHCR in 2008, he maintained ownership of the antique equipment, including the collection of steam locomotives. He built the Age of Steam Roundhouse in Sugarcreek, Ohio to house that equipment. The collection includes the following:

Operational:

 Canadian National 1551
 Buffalo Creek & Gauley Railroad 13
 Grand Trunk Western 6325
 Southern Wood Preserving Company 3
 Canadian Pacific 1293
 Lake Superior and Ishpeming 33

Awaiting restoration:

 Canadian National 96
 Canadian Pacific 1278
 Nickel Plate Road 763

Former engines:
 Baldwin Locomotive Works 26, was traded for Canadian National 1551 in 1986 to Steamtown.
Reading 2100, sold in 1998 to Tom Payne, and it was moved to St. Thomas, Ontario.
Mississippian Railway 76, sold in 2005 to the Steam Railroading Institute of Owosso, Michigan.

Jerry Jacobson died in 2017 at the age of 74.

Acquisition by Genesee and Wyoming
On August 5, 2008, Genesee & Wyoming announced an agreement to purchase the Ohio Central System for $219 million. Approval was granted by the Surface Transportation Board on December 30, 2008.

Notes

References

External links 
Ohio Central Railroad official webpage - Genesee and Wyoming website

United States railroad holding companies
Genesee & Wyoming
2008 mergers and acquisitions